Charles Franklin West (January 12, 1895 – December 27, 1955) was an American educator and politician who served two terms as a member of the United States House of Representatives from 1931 to 1935.

Biography
West was born in Mount Vernon, Ohio.  he received his education at local schools, and in later years, graduated from Ohio Wesleyan University in 1918 and enrolled at Harvard University in 1920. Between the years of 1924 and 1930, he served as a professor of political science at Denison University.

West was nominated, and elected as a Democrat to the seventy second and seventy-third congresses, he took up this role between March 4, 1931 and January 3, 1935. West had an unsuccessful nomination to become the United States Senator, however despite this failing to succeed, West continued other roles including delegate to the Democratic National Convention, among other careers at different times. Between 1940 and 1947, West engaged in unknown private business, only to leave this and become a professor at Akron University. West received the Democratic nomination to the eighty-fourth congress, but withdrew before the election.  he died in Bradenton, Florida, aged 60.

References

1895 births
1955 deaths
People from Mount Vernon, Ohio
Ohio Wesleyan University alumni
Harvard University alumni
Denison University faculty
University of Akron faculty
20th-century American politicians
Democratic Party members of the United States House of Representatives from Ohio